Granzyme H is a protein that in humans is encoded by the GZMH gene.

References

Further reading